Viora Daniel (1902–1980) was an American film actress of the silent era. She appeared in around twenty films, including several shorts, in a mixture of lead and supporting roles.

Selected filmography
 The Fourteenth Man (1920)
 Young Mrs. Winthrop (1920)
 The Sins of St. Anthony (1920)
 Life of the Party (1920)
 Thou Art the Man (1920)
 Be My Wife (1921)
 The Easy Road (1921)
 Saturday Night (1922)
 The Cowboy and the Lady (1922)
 Old Shoes (1925)
 Bulldog Pluck (1927)
 One Chance in a Million (1927)
 Quarantined Rivals (1927)

References

Bibliography
 Foster, Charles. Stardust and Shadows: Canadians in Early Hollywood. Dundurn, 2000.
 Massa, Steve. Slapstick Divas: The Women of Silent Comedy. BearManor Media, 2017.

External links

1902 births
1980 deaths
American film actresses
Actresses from California